Gushi may refer to:

Gushi County (固始县), Henan, China
Güshi Khan (1582–1655), ruler of the Khoshut Mongols
Jushi Kingdom or Gushi (姑師), ancient kingdom in Turpan, Xinjiang, China
Gushi (poetry) (古詩), Chinese verse form
Gushi Hui, a Chinese literary magazine
 Gushi Kola
Gushi Shinyu, 10th Dan Uechi-Ryū Master
Helena Gushi Kadare (born 1943), Albanian author